Samassékou is a Malian surname. Notable people with the surname include:

Adama Samassékou (born 1946), government minister of Mali
Diadie Samassékou (born 1996), Malian football midfielder 
Fatoumata Samassékou (born 1987), Malian swimmer 

Surnames of Malian origin